Jack Wilson Lydman (February 6, 1914 – September 17, 2005) was an actor, Foreign Service Officer, and a United States Ambassador to Malaysia (1969–1973).

After work with the Surry Players at the Mercury Theatre in New York City he join the US Army Air Forces during World War II becoming a division chief in the Strategic Bombing Survey of the War Department. He married and joined the United States Department of State in 1946 as a research assistant becoming chief of the Far East political section then deputy director of the Office of Intelligence Research. Commissioned as a Foreign Service Officer in 1955 he was posted as deputy director of the Research Center of the South East Asia Treaty Organization to Bangkok.  In 1958 he was assigned to Surabaya with responsibility for Portuguese Timor until appointed counselor for economic affairs to Jakarta (Indonesia) in 1960. After attending the Senior Seminar in 1961-1962, he appointed deputy chief of mission to Canberra (Australia) 1963. He returned to Jakarta in 1965 as DCM with the personal rank of minister. On 15 September 1969 President Richard Nixon appointed Lydman as Ambassador to Malaysia, serving in Kuala Lumpur until he retired on 20 December 1974.

Jack Lydman participated in planning the 1942 Doolittle Raid air raid on Japan but is best known for giving repeated testimony concerning the Central Intelligence Agency provision of names to General Suharto's forces during 1965, and for his 1969 review of Indonesian administration of West New Guinea (then called West Irian) which was obtained under the Freedom of Information Act and published by George Washington University in 2004.

References

External links
Diplomatic and Consular Officers Retired memorial notice
1969 Confidential assessment of West Irian situation for Washington
Interview with Jack Lydman

1914 births
2005 deaths
Ambassadors of the United States to Malaysia
United States Foreign Service personnel
United States Army Air Forces personnel of World War II